The 2011–12 season was Coventry City's 92nd season in The Football League and their 11th consecutive season in the Football League Championship, giving them the longest consecutive run out of all the teams in the division. In addition to the Championship, The Sky Blues also entered the League Cup in the First Round and will enter the FA Cup in the Third Round.

Review and events

Monthly events
This is a list of the significant events to occur at the club during the 2011–12 season, presented in chronological order. This list does not include transfers, which are listed in the transfers section below, or match results, which are in the results section.

June:
 16 – Coventry City draw Bury away in the League Cup First Round.
 17 – Coventry City's fixtures for the 2011–12 Championship season are announced
19 – Defender Jordan Clarke signs a new three-year contract extension running until June 2014. 	
19 – Strikers Callum Wilson and Shaun Jeffers sign new two-year contract extensions running until June 2013.
21 – Sammy Clingan is named new club captain for the 2011–12 season, taking over from Lee Carsley.
27 – Goalkeeper Danny Ireland signs a new one-year contract extension running until June 2012. 	
27 – Defender Nathan Cameron signs a new two-year contract extension running until June 2013.

July:
 20 – Coventry City announce the new squad numbers for the forthcoming season.
 22 – Coventry City appoint former captain Lee Carsley as Under-18s coach.

August
4 – Defender James McPake signs a new one-year contract extension running until June 2013. 	
4 – Midfielder David Bell signs a new three-year contract extension running until June 2015.
8 – Midfielder Gaël Bigirimana signs a new one-year contract extension running until June 2014.
22 – Cyrus Christie is named in the Official Football League Championship team of the week, following his performance against Watford.
23- An official takeover bid is made for Coventry City by a consortium fronted by former Vice-Chairman Gary Hoffman.
27- The official takeover bid fronted by former Vice-Chairman Gary Hoffman is withdrawn due to possible rule breach.

September
2 – Goalkeeper Lee Burge signs a new two-year contract extension running until June 2014.
12 – Cyrus Christie is named in the Official Football League Championship team of the week, following his performance against Derby County.

October
18 – Joe Murphy and Chris Hussey are named in the Official Football League Championship team of the week, following their performances against Nottingham Forest.
18 – Midfielder Carl Baker signs a new three-year contract extension running until June 2015.

November
8 – Midfielder Gary McSheffrey signs a one-year contract extension running until June 2013.
15 – Director Leonard Brody stands down from his position with immediate effect.
26 – Coventry City set up a link with Norwegian club IF Helle.

December
2 – Ken Dulieu stands down as Coventry City Chairman and take up Head Of Football Operations role.
4 – Coventry City draw Southampton away in the FA Cup Third Round.
20 – Former Coventry City chairman Ken Dulieu resigns as Head of Football Operations.

February
13 – Jordan Willis is called up to the England Under-18 squad for the first time for the match against Poland Under-19.
15 – Coventry City played Kettering Town in a fundraising friendly match to raise money for the Blue Square Bet Premier club. The match raised over £6,000l.
27 – Richard Keogh is named in the Official Football League Championship team of the week, following his performance against Barnsley.

March
2 – Coventry City have a transfer embargo placed on them for not filing their annual accounts.
7 – Jordan Willis wins first cap for England Under-18 in friendly against Poland Under-19.
11 – Gaël Bigirimana wins Championship Apprentice Of The Year Award for 2011/2012.
19 – Joe Murphy is named in the Official Football League Championship team of the week, following his performance against Watford.
26 – Chris Hussey is named in the Official Football League Championship team of the week, following his performance against Portsmouth.

April
2 – Richard Keogh is named in the Official Football League Championship team of the week, following his performance against Hull City.
16 – Richard Keogh wins Irish Supporters' Club Player of the Season Award for 2011/2012.
17 – Richard Keogh wins South Wales Supporters' Club's Player of the Season Award for 2011/2012.
18 – Richard Keogh wins London Supporters' Club Player of the Season Award for 2011/2012.
21 – Coventry City are relegated from the Football League Championship and will play in the Football League One next season.
21 – Richard Keogh wins Coventry City Supporters' Club Player of the Season Award for 2011/2012.
21 – Gaël Bigirimana wins Community Player of the Season Award for 2011/2012.
21 – Cyrus Christie wins Young Player of the Season Award for 2011/2012.
21 – Jordan Clarke wins Goal of the Season Award for 2011/2012 for his strike against Cardiff City.
21 – Gary McSheffrey wins Top Scorer Award for 2011/2012.
21 – Richard Keogh wins Players' Player of the Season Award for 2011/2012.
21 – Richard Keogh wins Fans' Player of the Season Award for 2011/2012.
26 – Academy player Joe Henderson was handed a first team squad number, He has been given the number 39 shirt.

Squad details

Players info

Matches

Pre-season friendlies

Championship

FA Cup

League Cup

Championship data

League table

Results summary

Round by round

Season statistics

Starts and goals

|-
|colspan="14"|Players played for Coventry this season who have left before the season ends:

|}

Goalscorers

Assists

Yellow cards

Red cards

Captains

Penalties Awarded

Suspensions served

Monthly & Weekly Awards

End of Season Awards

International Appearances

Overall

Transfers

Transfers in

Transfers out

Loans in

Loans out

Trials

References

External links
 Official Site: 2010/2011 Fixtures & Results
 BBC Sport – Club Stats
 Soccerbase – Results | Squad Stats | Transfers

Coventry City
Coventry City F.C. seasons